Larry Kirkland (born 1950) is an abstract sculptor whose installations are found in civic and corporate plazas in many states throughout the United States.

Selected works 

 Capitalism (1991), Lloyd Center, Portland, Oregon
 Garden Wreath (1997), Central Library, Portland, Oregon
 Oregon Weathervanes (2002), Portland International Airport, Oregon
 Solar Wreath  (1997), Central Library, Portland, Oregon

References

External links 

 
 
 
 
 
 
 

Living people
Abstract sculptors
American sculptors
1950 births